Luc Nijholt (born 29 July 1961) is a Dutch football manager and a former player, who played for a number of clubs, both home and abroad. 

Nijholt began his career in the early 1980s with Haarlem, spending six years with the club. Nijholt was a member of the famous Haarlem team that competed in the UEFA Cup in the 1982–83 season, for the first time in the club's history. However this campaign was to be overshadowed by the Luzhniki disaster. He then moved on to single seasons with AZ, Utrecht and Swiss side Old Boys. In 1990, Nijholt moved to Scottish side Motherwell and helped them win the Scottish Cup in his first season. 

In 1993, he moved to English]side Swindon Town for a fee of £175,000, spending two years with The Robins. He joined them after they won promotion to the FA Premier League, but couldn't prevent from being relegated after just one reason with a mere five wins and a defence that leaked 100 goals in the league. However, he did score his only goal for Swindon on 19 March 1994 in a surprise 2–2 home draw against that season's double winners Manchester United. A year later he was part of the side which reached the Football League Cup semi finals but suffered a second successive relegation.

After leaving Swindon in 1995, Nijholt joined Volendam and spent three years with them before retiring in 1998.

Nijholt became manager of Stormvogels Telstar in 2005 and has since declared his interest in managing former clubs Swindon and Motherwell, although neither application was successful.

He was the assistant coach of FC Red Bull Salzburg (Austria) during 2008–09 season. In 2010, he reunited with Co Adriaanse to be part of his coaching staff with the Qatar national team.

Personal life
His son Gianluca Nijholt is also a professional footballer.

Honours
 Scottish Cup: 1990–91

References

External links

1961 births
Living people
Footballers from Zaanstad
Association football defenders
Association football midfielders
Dutch footballers
Premier League players
English Football League players
Scottish Football League players
Eredivisie players
HFC Haarlem players
AZ Alkmaar players
FC Utrecht players
FC Volendam players
BSC Old Boys players
Motherwell F.C. players
Swindon Town F.C. players
Dutch football managers
SC Telstar managers
Dutch expatriate footballers
Expatriate footballers in Scotland
Expatriate footballers in England
Expatriate footballers in Switzerland
Expatriate football managers in China
Meizhou Hakka F.C. managers